Abbas Ali Mandal (died 26 July 2022) was a Bangladesh Awami League politician who served as Member of Parliament of Joypurhat-1.

He died on 26 July 2022 in Shaheed Suhrawardy Medical College & Hospital, Dhaka.

Career
Mandal was elected to parliament from Joypurhat-1 as a Bangladesh Awami League candidate in 1986.

References

20th-century births
2022 deaths
Awami League politicians
3rd Jatiya Sangsad members
People from Joypurhat District
Year of birth missing